Heidi Parviainen (born 8 March 1979) is a Finnish heavy metal singer and lead vocalist of symphonic metal band Dark Sarah.

She previously fronted Amberian Dawn and is a classically trained lyric soprano.

Career

Agonia, Iconofear (1997–2006)

With Amberian Dawn (2006–2012)

It turned out that she was exactly what they were looking for, due to her ability to both sing and contribute lyrics. This completed the band's lineup, now under the name of Amberian Dawn.

Heidi started to write lyrics which were often influenced by Finnish and Norse mythology, and many songs reference the Finnish national poem Kalevala. She undertook three European tours with the band and performed at several European festivals.

On 19 November 2012 the band announced that Heidi had parted ways with them. The decision was made in early 2012, making thus Metal Female Voices Fest their last show together with Heidi.

Dark Sarah (2012–present)
A few days after her departure, Heidi announced that she had started a new musical project called "Dark Sarah". She said Dark Sarah "is making one of my dreams come true, a dream that had been sleeping for many years but now has finally awoken."

Heidi explained the concept:

The musical style combines elements of film music, metal music and music theater. The album called Behind the Black Veil, will feature several guest musicians such as Manuela Kraller, Inga Scharf (Van Canto) and Kasperi Heikkinen (U.D.O, Merging Flare). Dark Sarah consists of a talented band including musicians like: Erkka Korhonen (guitar) (Raskasta Joulua, Northern Kings), Sami-Petri Salonen (guitar), Jukka Koskinen (bass) (Wintersun) and Lauri Kuussalo (drums).

Dark Sarah has released three albums so far after an initial EP. The first album, Behind the Black Veil, was released in 2014. This was followed by The Puzzle (released 2016) and The Golden Moth (released 2018). The Violent Roses EP was released in 2014.

In 2020 the band announced their signing to Napalm Records and a new studio album called "Grim".

Other works
Parviainen has performed with a few other bands in studio, with Eternal Tears of Sorrow on the song "Tears of Autumn Rain" from the album Children of the Dark Waters in 2009, and with Ensiferum on their album Unsung Heroes, providing the choir vocals.

Discography

Dark Sarah 
Studio albums
 Behind the Black Veil (2015)
 The Puzzle (2016)
 The Golden Moth (2018)
 Grim (2020)
 Attack of Orym (2023)
EPs
 Violent Roses (2014)

Music videos
 Save Me (2013)
 Memories Fall (2014) (feat. Manuela Kraller)
 Hunting The Dreamer (2014)
 Light in You (2015) (feat. Tony Kakko)
 Little Men (2016)
 Aquarium (2016) (feat. Charlotte Wessels – lyric video)
 Dance with the Dragon (2016) (feat. Juha-Pekka Leppäluoto)
 Trespasser (2017)

Amberian Dawn 
Demos
 Amberian Dawn (demo) (2006)

Studio albums
 River of Tuoni (2008)
 The Clouds of Northland Thunder (2009)
 End of Eden (2010)
 Circus Black (2012)

Singles
 "He Sleeps in a Grove" (2009)
 "Arctica" (2010)
 "Cold Kiss" (2012)

Iconofear 
EPs
 Dark (EP) (2003)
 The 13th Circle (2005)
 The Unbreathing (2006)

Agonia 
Demos
 Demo I (1997)

Guest appearances 
2009: Children of the Dark Waters (Eternal Tears of Sorrow) (vocals on "Tears of Autumn Rain")
2012: Unsung Heroes (Ensiferum) (choir vocals)

References

External links
Dark Sarah Official Website
Heidi Parviainen Official Facebook
Dark Sarah Official Facebook
Dark Sarah Official Twitter
Dark Sarah Official Myspace
Dark Sarah Official YouTube

1979 births
Living people
People from Espoo
Finnish heavy metal singers
Finnish sopranos
Amberian Dawn members